South Korea and Vietnam established formal diplomatic relations on 22 December 1992, though the two countries had already had various historical contacts long before that. According to Vietnamese Prime Minister Phan Văn Khải, "The Republic of Korea is a very important partner of Vietnam and a good model for Vietnam to expand cooperation and exchange experiences during its development process."

History
In ancient times, Korea and Vietnam were within the Sinosphere and share the same Confucian ethical philosophy and model of political governing, culture and social structure. Choe Chiwon (857-?), a Silla Confucian official wrote "borders of Jiaozhi" and the Protectorate of Annam. Semi-official encounters regularly happened when envoys from both countries met in China for tribute visits.

The last remaining survivors of the Lý dynasty had fled to Korea following Trần Thủ Độ's total massacre of the Lý family. One of famous Lý survivors was Lý Long Tường, who later helped to defeat the Mongols and halted total Mongol occupation of Korea for many years, even though Korea was eventually forced to become a Mongol vassal. For these efforts, he was revered as one of the most important heroes in the Mongol wars and became a significant part of history forming the historical and mutual bond between Korea and Vietnam that exists for eight centuries and still remains since.

Vietnam War

Both North and South Korea lent material and manpower support to their respective ideological allies during the Vietnam War, though the number of South Korean troops on the ground was larger. Then-South Korean president Syngman Rhee had offered to send troops to Vietnam as early as 1954, but his proposal was turned down by the U.S. Department of State; the first South Korean personnel to land in Vietnam, 10 years later, were non-combatants: ten Taekwondo instructors, along with thirty-four officers and ninety-six enlisted men of a Korean Army hospital unit. 

In total, between 1965 and 1973, 312,853 South Korean soldiers fought in Vietnam; Vietnam's Ministry of Culture and Communications in an unofficial investigation estimated they killed 41,400 enemy fighters and 5,000 civilians. After the Vietnam war, there were thousands of children of mixed Korean and Vietnamese descent, called Lai Dai Han, born of Korean workers or soldiers and local Vietnamese.  Reportedly, many resulted from widespread "My Lai-style massacres" that involved the rape of Vietnamese Women by South Korean soldiers.  Various civil society groups continue to hope for a formal investigation and apology into these events.  

In 2001, South Korean president Kim Dae-jung expressed his sorrow that Korea had unintentionally inflicted pain upon the Vietnamese people during the Vietnam War.  He also promised to continue supporting Vietnamese development.

As stated by Vietnamese president Trần Đức Lương in 2004:

In 2009, South Korea and Vietnam agreed to lift the bilateral relationship to the “comprehensive partnership”. In 2003, readers of South Korean newspaper Hankyoreh, which ran a series of articles exposing atrocities committed by South Korean troops during the war, donated over US$100,000 to set up a memorial park and peace museum in Phú Yên Province. Former South Korean soldiers such as Ahn Junghyo and Hwang Sok-yong have also written novels about their experiences in Vietnam.

In 2017, Moon Jae-in apologised vaguely to Vietnam, although the issue was minimized by the Vietnamese media and South Korean media as it wasn't seen as an official apology, and South Korean civil groups and individuals have also taken a pro-active effort in reconciliation.

North Korea 
In the aftermath of the controversial 2006 North Korean nuclear test, Foreign Ministry Spokesman Le Dzung expressed the Vietnamese Government's grave concern over the test, stating that it will heighten tensions and threaten the region's stability, and stated that Vietnam supports the "denuclearization" of the Korean peninsula. After the ROKS Cheonan sinking of 2010, Foreign Ministry Spokeswoman Nguyen Phuong Nga said: "The sinking of Cheonan is a regrettable incident. The Government of Vietnam expresses its heart-felt condolences to the Government of the Republic of Korea for the loss of lives in the sinking. Vietnam has attentively and closely been following the current developments in the Korean Peninsula. Vietnam consistently and persistently supports peace, stability in the Korean Peninsula, and favors dialogue for peaceful settlement of all matters. Vietnam wishes that parties concerned could exercise restraint for the sake of peace, stability in the Korean Peninsula and in the region."

Trade and investment

Four years after the 1992 normalisation of diplomatic ties, South Korea was already annually conducting $1.3 billion of trade with Vietnam, making them Vietnam's third-largest trading partner; they were also the fourth-largest foreign investor after Taiwan, Japan, and Hong Kong, having put $1.987 billion into Vietnam. The pace of their investment roughly doubled over the next ten years; in the first five months of 2006, new South Korean investment in Vietnam totalled to around $400 million, and roughly one thousand Korean companies had operations in the country.

Movement of people
 there are nearly a hundred thousand each of Koreans in Vietnam and Vietnamese people in South Korea.

Tourism

As of 2018, South Korean tourists accounted for 3,485,406 tourists in Vietnam, second only to China (4,966,468 tourists). Flights from South Korea accounted for a remarkable 44.5 per cent of the country's inbound traffic in 2018. Da Nang, and Hoi An are the top destinations that South Korean Tourists visit.

Diplomatic missions

Of Vietnam
Seoul (Embassy)

Of South Korea
Hanoi (Embassy)
Ho Chi Minh City (Consulate)

Vietnamese Ambassadors to South Korea 
 South Vietnam Ambassadors to South Korea
 Dương Văn Đức (1956–1957, Minister)
 Nguyễn Quí Anh (1957–1964, Chargé d'affaires)
 Ngô Tôn Đạt (1964–1966, Chargé d'affaires)
 Ngô Tôn Đạt (1966–1967)
 Đỗ Cao Trí (1967–1968)
 Đặng Ngọc Diệu (1968–1969, Chargé d'affaires)
 Phạm Xuân Chiểu (1969–1975, until the Fall of Saigon)

 Vietnam Ambassadors to South Korea
 Nguyễn Vũ Tùng (201?-)

See also
 North Korea–Vietnam relations
 Park Hang-seo

References

 
Vietnam
Bilateral relations of Vietnam
Korea–Vietnam relations